Fulton Township may refer to:

 Fulton Township, Fulton County, Arkansas, in Fulton County, Arkansas
 Fulton Township, Whiteside County, Illinois
 Fulton Township, Fountain County, Indiana
 Fulton Township, Muscatine County, Iowa
 Fulton Township, Webster County, Iowa
 Fulton Township, Michigan
 Fulton Township, Fulton County, Ohio
 Fulton Township, Lancaster County, Pennsylvania

Township name disambiguation pages